Bayezid I Mosque (Turkish: Yıldırım Camii or Yıldırım Bayezid Camii) is a historic mosque in Bursa, Turkey, that is part of the large complex (külliye) built by the Ottoman Sultan Bayezid I  (Yıldırım Bayezid – Bayezid the Thunderbolt) between 1391–1395. It is situated in Bursa metropolitan district of Yıldırım, also named after the same sultan. It underwent extensive renovation following the 1855 Bursa earthquake.

Architecture 
The mosque comprises a central hall with a large dome flanked by eyvans on the east and west with smaller domes and another large domed eyvan with mihrab on the south.

There are four rooms with fireplaces and cupboards to the north and south of side of the eyvans. The southern rooms are accessed directly from the central hall while the northern rooms are accessed thought small vestibules. Each northern room also contains two niches on the sides that are accessed through the vestibules. The entrance hall of the mosque features high domed ceilings. The last prayer section (semi-open section of the mosque at the north end) is built with five sub-sections and each subsection is covered with an individual dome.

In the Yıldırım Camii, all three eyvans were built three steps higher than the central hall. Yıldırım Camii was the first structure where a Bursa Arch was implemented. This flattened arch is located in between the central hall and south eyvan and connects and supports the two large domes. There are two minarets on the sides of the mosque. Unlike similar mosques of its time in Bursa, Yıldırım Camii was constructed entirely out of dimension stones and bricks were not used in any part of the mosque.

References

External links 

 Yildirim Bayezid Külliyesi, Archnet
 Some 45 pictures of the complex

Mosques completed in 1395
Mosque buildings with domes
1395 establishments in the Ottoman Empire
Ottoman mosques in Bursa
Yıldırım, Bursa